Matveyevo-Kurgansky District is an administrative and municipal district (raion), one of the forty-three in Rostov Oblast, Russia. It is located in the west of the oblast. Its administrative center is the rural locality (a settlement) of Matveyev Kurgan. Population: 43,446 (2010 Census);  The population of Matveyev Kurgan accounts for 35.9% of the district's total population.

References

Notes

Sources

Districts of Rostov Oblast